Pen Llithrig y Wrach is a mountain peak in Snowdonia, Wales. It is one of the four Marilyns that make up the Carneddau range. To the east is Creigiau Gleision, another Marilyn, while to the west is Pen yr Helgi Du and Carnedd Llewelyn. Craig Eigiau and Llyn Eigiau can be seen to the north, while Gallt yr Ogof, Glyder Fach and Tryfan can be viewed to the south.

It has one of the more colourful names of any British mountain, translating as slippery peak of the witch, perhaps in reference to the boggy conditions underfoot, or because of the resemblance of its pointed profile to an archetypal witch's hat.

It is an outlier of the Carneddau, the higher peaks of which can be reached from Pen Llithrig y Wrach via Pen yr Helgi Du. On its eastern side, the mountain slopes steeply down to Llyn Cowlyd.

It may be climbed from the southern side, from Capel Curig or the A5, or from the north-east, from Dolgarrog or Tal-y-bont in the Conwy valley. It is quite prominent when viewed from the north near Llandudno.

References

External links
 www.geograph.co.uk : photos of Pen Llithrig Y Wrach and surrounding area

Mountains and hills of Snowdonia
Marilyns of Wales
Hewitts of Wales
Nuttalls
Mountains and hills of Conwy County Borough
Dolgarrog